Marushka is a rural locality (a selo) and the administrative center of Marushinsky Selsoviet, Tselinny District, Altai Krai, Russia. The population was 1,059 as of 2013. It was founded in 1777. There are 19 streets.

Geography 
Marushka is located 36 km south of Tselinnoye (the district's administrative centre) by road. Druzhba is the nearest rural locality.

References 

Rural localities in Tselinny District, Altai Krai